Zero Tolerance is a 2015 Thai-American action film directed by Wych Kaosayananda and starring Dustin Nguyen, Gary Daniels and Scott Adkins. It premiered on February 10, 2015 at the Thailand International Film Destination Festival.

Premise 
Two former paramilitary operatives, Johnny (Nguyen) and his police detective friend Peter (Boonthanakit), search Bangkok to find the killers of Johnny's young daughter Angel (Paosut) and deliver retribution.

Production 
The film was produced in 2011 and was originally titled Angels. It was initially conceived as more of a slow-burn, character-driven affair before becoming a swift-paced action drama. Dustin Nguyen's wife Bebe Pham took the role of the madam of a high-end sex club.

References

External links 
 
 

2015 crime action films
2015 crime thriller films
2015 action thriller films
2015 films
American crime action films
Thai action films
Thai films about revenge
English-language Thai films
American films about revenge
American crime thriller films
American action thriller films
2010s English-language films
Films directed by Wych Kaosayananda
2010s American films